Nyldy is a village in the Talas Region of north-west Kyrgyzstan. It is part of the Manas District. Its population was 840 in 2021.

References

Populated places in Talas Region